Gauss's lemma can mean any of several lemmas named after Carl Friedrich Gauss:

 
 
 
 A generalization of Euclid's lemma is sometimes called Gauss's lemma

See also 

 List of topics named after Carl Friedrich Gauss

Lemmas

it:Lemma di Gauss